Eutelsat S.A. is a French satellite operator. Providing coverage over the entire European continent, the Middle East, Africa, Asia and the Americas, it is  the world's third-largest satellite operator in terms of revenues.

Eutelsat's satellites are used for broadcasting nearly 7,000 television stations, of which 1,400 are in high-definition television, and 1,100 radio stations to over 274 million cable and satellite homes. They also serve requirements for TV contribution services, corporate networks, mobile communications, Internet backbone connectivity and broadband access for terrestrial, maritime and in-flight applications. EUTELSAT is headquartered in Paris, France. Eutelsat Communications Chief Executive Officer is currently Eva Berneke.

In October 2017, Eutelsat acquired Noorsat, one of the leading satellite service providers in the Middle East, from Bahrain's Orbit Holding Group. Noorsat is the premier distributor of Eutelsat capacity in the Middle East, serving blue-chip customers and providing services for over 300 TV channels almost exclusively from Eutelsat's market-leading the Middle East and North Africa neighbourhoods at 7/8° West and 25.5° East.

On 26 July 2022, Eutelsat announced a merger with LEO satellite internet operator OneWeb.

History 

The European Telecommunications Satellite Organization (Eutelsat) was originally set up in 1977, by 17 European countries as an intergovernmental organisation (IGO). Its role was to develop and operate a satellite-based telecommunications infrastructure for Europe. The Convention establishing the European Telecommunications Satellite Organization Eutelsat was opened for signature in July 1982 and entered into force on 1 September 1985.

In 1982, Eutelsat decided to start operations of its first TV channel (Satellite Television) on the Orbital Test Satellite (OTS) in cooperation with European Space Agency (ESA). This was the first satellite-based direct-to-home TV channel launched in Europe. In 1983, Eutelsat launched its first satellite to be used for telecommunications and TV distribution

Initially established to address satellite telecommunications demand in Western Europe, Eutelsat rapidly developed its infrastructure to expand coverage to additional services (i.e. TV) and markets, such as Central and Eastern Europe in 1989, and the Middle East, the African continent, and large parts of Asia and the Americas from the 1990s.

EUTELSAT was the first satellite operator in Europe to broadcast television channels direct-to-home. It developed its premium neighbourhood of five Hot Bird satellites in the mid-1990s to offer capacity that would be able to attract hundreds of channels to the same orbital location, appealing to wider audiences for consumer satellite TV.

With the general liberalisation of the telecommunications sector in Europe, Eutelsat's assets, liabilities and operational activities were transferred to a private company called Eutelsat S.A. established for this purpose in July 2001. The structure role and activities of the new intergovernmental organisation Eutelsat IGO evolved. According to Eutelsat IGO's amended constitution in 2016, the main purpose of EUTELSAT IGO has been to ensure that Eutelsat S.A. observes the Basic Principles set forth in the EUTELSAT Amended Convention entered into force in November 2002. These Basic Principles refer to public service/universal service obligations, pan European coverage by the satellite system, non-discrimination and fair competition. The Executive Secretary of EUTELSAT IGO participates in all meetings of the Board of Directors of Eutelsat Communications S.A. and Eutelsat S.A. as an observer to the Board (censeur).

In April 2005, the principal shareholders of Eutelsat S.A. grouped their investment in a new entity (Eutelsat Communications), which is now the holding company of the Group owning 95.2% of Eutelsat S.A. on 6 October 2005. As of 2009, the holding company owned 96.0% of Eutelsat S.A.

On 31 July 2013, Eutelsat Communications announced the 100% acquisition of Satélites Mexicanos, S.A. de C.V. ("Satmex") for US$831 million in cash plus the assumption of US$311 million in Satmex debt, pending government and regulatory approvals. The transaction was finalized on 2 January 2014. Based in Mexico, Satmex operates three satellites at contiguous positions, 113° West (Satmex 6), 114.9° West (Satmex 5) and 116.8° West (Satmex 8) that cover 90% of the population of the Americas.

In December 2015, the company announced a partnership with Facebook to launch an internet satellite over Africa by 2016 where Facebook lease all of a satellite's high throughput Ka-band capacity, however, the satellite was destroyed during launch preparations.

In December 2020, Eutelsat launched Eutelsat Konnect, a domestic broadband service targeting remote localities, in the United Kingdom with a planned subsequent launch across Europe.

In July 2021, Eutelsat launched Eutelsat Quantum, the first full software-defined satellite. It will enable users, notably in the Government and Mobility markets, to actively define and shape performance and reach thanks to its software-based design.

In December 2021, Eva Berneke was appointed Chief Executive Officer to replace Rodolphe Belmer. She will take up her position on January 1, 2022.

In March 2022, in the context of the 2022 Russian invasion of Ukraine and growing censorship in Russia, two of the Russian packagers active on the 36°E Eutelsat satellites, NTV Plus (a subsidiary of Gazprom Media) and Trikolor, unilaterally interrupted broadcasting of 8 international news channels (BBC World, CNN, Deustche Welle, Euronews, France 24, NHK World, RAInews 24, TV5 Monde). This interruption was denounced by the Denis Diderot Committee, made up of academics and professionals from the European audiovisual sector, which published a report and launched a petition asking for sanctions from the European Union and EUTELSAT IGO against the two operators. The petition is signed by all members of the Ukrainian regulatory body, the National Radio and Television Council.

Distribution of East European TV 

Eutelsat continues to collaborate with Russian TV platforms such as NTV-Plus and Tricolor. In France, the association Denis Diderot Committee has started a petition to put pressure on the EU to get Eutelsat to drop cooperation with the Russian channels. In a press release, the association writes that it is 'paradoxical and unforgivable' that European satellites are used to broadcast Russian channels, which 'only spread the Kremlin's official state propaganda.

As top manager of French Eutelsat, Danish Eva Berneke defended the strategy in a podcast interview with Techmediet Radar: "It is clear that then we would have to wave goodbye to some Russian customers, who would then move on to some Russian satellites or something else". Media spokesman Kasper Sand Kjær  of the Danish Social Democrats comments this decision with: "I think everyone should decide for themselves which side you want to stand on in the story. I do not believe that one can get through the time we are in right now by saying that one is neutral".

As described above, Russian customers already actively censored western channels in their broadcasts on 36°E, which made the claims of Eutelsat's neutrality even more absurd.

Services 

In June 2021, Eutelsat launched Eutelsat ADVANCE, an end-to-end managed connectivity service, including network interconnection, a management portal and APIs for service providers and their clients. Available via Eutelsat's certified network of partners, Eutelsat ADVANCE enables service providers in Enterprise, Maritime, Aviation, Government and Telecoms to enhance their service portfolio by increasing the range of connectivity services they offer.

In September 2018, Eutelsat announced CIRRUS, which enabled broadcasters to deliver content to satellite and over-the-top media service. Viewers can watch content on screens, phones and tablets, access multiple programmes, record and rewind and view detailed programme information.

With a global fleet of satellites and associated ground infrastructure, Eutelsat enables clients across Video, Data, Government, Fixed and Mobile Broadband markets to communicate effectively to their customers, irrespective of their location. Over 6800 television channels operated by leading media groups are broadcast by Eutelsat to one billion viewers equipped for DTH reception or connected to terrestrial networks.

Satellites 
Eutelsat sells capacity on 36 satellites located in geosynchronous orbit between 133° West and 174° East. On 1 March 2012, Eutelsat changed the names of its satellites. The group's satellites mostly take the Eutelsat name, with the relevant figure for their orbital position and a letter indicating their order of arrival at that position. On 21 May 2014, Eutelsat Americas (formerly Satmex) aligned its satellite names with the Eutelsat brand.

Rented capacity

Former satellites

Bibliography 

  Guy Lebègue, (trad. Robert J. Amral), «Eutelsat II: OK For West-to-East Service!», in Revue aerospatiale, n° 73, November 1990

References

External links
 
 

 
Communications satellite operators
Satellite Internet access
Telecommunications companies of Europe
Companies listed on Euronext Paris